Parliamentary elections were held in Finland on 18 and 19 March 1979.

Background
Prime Minister Martti Miettunen's centrist minority government (Centre Party, Swedish People's Party and Liberal Party) resigned in May 1977, and Social Democrat Kalevi Sorsa returned to office as Prime Minister after having served two years earlier.  He formed a centre-left majority government, which stimulated the economy by deficit spending, tax cuts to businesses and some public works projects. The economy started to grow again in 1978, after a two-year recession; unemployment peaked at 8.5% (about 200,000 unemployed) in 1978 and inflation remained high.

Results

Aftermath
The National Coalition Party had conducted a vigorous election campaign, demanding to be allowed to re-join the government after thirteen years in the opposition. They reaped the benefits of this campaign, and of the usual decrease of long-time governing parties' support, by picking up twelve seats and becoming the second-largest party.  Their leader, Harri Holkeri, negotiated with the various parliamentary parties and concluded in April 1979 that no stable majority centre-right government could be formed, because the traditional bourgeois parties (the Centre Party, the National Coalition Party, the Swedish People's Party and the Liberal People's Party) considered the Finnish Christian League and Finnish Rural Party too ideologically extreme or old-fashioned to become reliable coalition partners. Holkeri declined to form a government, but Sorsa refused to continue as Prime Minister, due to the unpopularity that he had suffered amid the recession's lingering effects, his role in the establishment of the soon-to-be-bankrupt television cathode-ray tube factory Valco, his alleged belittling of family violence in a television interview, and his health problems (back pain).

Trade and Industry Minister Pirkko Työläjärvi refused President Urho Kekkonen's offer to become Prime Minister, because she claimed to be unprepared for such a large task. Kekkonen finally turned to Governor of the Bank of Finland Mauno Koivisto of the Social Democrats, who managed to form a centre-left majority government in late May 1979.  The veteran Centrist politician Johannes Virolainen claimed in his memoirs that Kekkonen had appointed Koivisto as Prime Minister on the advice of former Prime Minister Miettunen, who claimed that the Finnish people would then see that Koivisto was not as intelligent as they had believed him to be. Kekkonen's official biographer, historian Juhani Suomi, disagreed, and claimed that Koivisto was Kekkonen's last remaining choice as Prime Minister – unless Kekkonen had intended to appoint a caretaker government. Koivisto's second – and final – government would last, despite frequent internal disagreements (their background was Kekkonen's imminent resignation as President and Koivisto's supreme popularity as his successor), until February 1982.

References

General elections in Finland
Finland
Parliament
Finland
Election and referendum articles with incomplete results